Sleepy-Time Squirrel is a 1954 MGM cartoon featuring Barney Bear. It is the 25th Barney Bear short.

Plot
Barney gets ready to hibernate for the winter, but notices that he is out of firewood, so he chops a nearby tree to get some. Unbeknownst to him, the tree was the home of a squirrel named Jimmy who was also hibernating, so Barney calms the irate squirrel by letting him sleep in his cabinet drawer. Jimmy turns out to be noisy, breaking crockery, opening a window, and giving off loud noises while eating nuts. When Jimmy does fall asleep, he has nightmares of being chased by an angry purple turtle, waking him up again.

Barney gives Jimmy a sleeping pill to make him doze off immediately, but Jimmy snores so loudly that he keeps Barney awake. Barney puts a hose onto Jimmy's mouth and puts the other end in a tree outside his house to divert the noise. However, inside the tree, a sleeping striped wild cat is awakened by the noise, and angrily follows the hose, which the squirrel has now placed over Barney's mouth. The cat blows into the hose in revenge and inflates Barney into a balloon. Barney whooshes around the house before shrinking and landing in Jimmy's lap, who happily adopts him as a teddy bear and, cuddling Barney, finally goes to sleep.

See also
 The Bear That Couldn't Sleep
 Bah Wilderness
 Barney's Hungry Cousin
 Wee-Willie Wildcat
 Bird-Brain Bird Dog

References

External links

1954 animated films
1954 short films
1954 films
1950s American animated films
1950s animated short films
Films directed by Dick Lundy
Metro-Goldwyn-Mayer animated short films
Films scored by Scott Bradley
Films with screenplays by Henry Wilson Allen
Animated films about squirrels
Films about sleep
Films produced by Fred Quimby
Barney Bear films
Metro-Goldwyn-Mayer cartoon studio short films
1950s English-language films